The Americas Zone was one of the three zones of the regional Davis Cup competition in 1999.

In the Americas Zone there were four different tiers, called groups, in which teams competed against each other to advance to the upper tier. The top two teams in Group III advanced to the Americas Zone Group II in 2000, whereas the bottom two teams were relegated to the Americas Zone Group IV in 2000.

Participating nations

Draw
 Venue: Fredo Maduro Centre, Panama City, Panama
 Date: 3–7 May

Group A

Group B

1st to 4th place play-offs

5th to 8th place play-offs

Final standings

  and  promoted to Group II in 2000.
  and  relegated to Group IV in 2000.

Round robin

Group A

Netherlands Antilles vs. El Salvador

Antigua and Barbuda vs. Guatemala

Netherlands Antilles vs. Guatemala

Antigua and Barbuda vs. El Salvador

Netherlands Antilles vs. Antigua and Barbuda

El Salvador vs. Guatemala

Group B

Panama vs. Honduras

Bolivia vs. Jamaica

Panama vs. Jamaica

Bolivia vs. Honduras

Panama vs. Bolivia

Honduras vs. Jamaica

1st to 4th place play-offs

Semifinals

Guatemala vs. Bolivia

El Salvador vs. Panama

Final

Guatemala vs. El Salvador

3rd to 4th play-off

Bolivia vs. Panama

5th to 8th place play-offs

5th to 8th play-offs

Netherlands Antilles vs. Honduras

Antigua and Barbuda vs. Jamaica

5th to 6th play-off

Netherlands Antilles vs. Jamaica

7th to 8th play-off

Honduras vs. Antigua and Barbuda

References

External links
Davis Cup official website

Davis Cup Americas Zone
Americas Zone Group III